Jim Hamilton is an American politician, serving in the Montana House of Representatives since 2017. A member of the Democratic Party, Hamilton represents District 61.

Hamilton is running for re-election to a fourth term in the 2022 Montana House of Representatives election.

Montana House of Representatives

Tenure 
Early in 2017, Hamilton supported increasing the tobacco tax by $1.50 per pack of cigarettes. The bill failed to pass out of the tax committee.

Hamilton opposed the tax plan put forward by national members of the Republican Party in 2017, arguing that these would worsen the state's deficit. This came after legislators from the Montana Republican Party dramatically curbed spending in the state to make up for budget shortfalls.

In 2021, Hamilton co-sponsored a "move over, slow down" bill to strengthen laws protecting first responders directing traffic, after two tow truck operators were killed in an accident. He also opposed a push by Republican state legislators to impose a strict dress code in the House of Representatives, which would have mandated suits and ties.

Committee assignments 
 Appropriations Committee
 Joint Interim Committee on Revenue
 Joint Legislative Finance Committee
 Joint Subcommittee on Long-Range Planning
 Legislative Administration Committee (Vice Chair)
 Rules Committee

Personal life 
Hamilton resides in Bozeman, Montana. He is married, and has two children.

Electoral history

2016

2018

2020

References

External links 
 Jim Hamilton - Montana Legislature page
 Jim Hamilton (Montana) - Ballotpedia page
 Jim Hamilton for Montana - Facebook page

Democratic Party members of the Montana House of Representatives
Eastern Michigan University alumni
Politicians from Albuquerque, New Mexico
Politicians from Bozeman, Montana
Living people
1959 births